Born in the U.S.A. is the seventh studio album by American recording artist Bruce Springsteen, released on June 4, 1984, by Columbia Records. 

It has been certified 17× Platinum by the RIAA, selling over 17 million units in the United States, and over 30 million copies worldwide. Born in the U.S.A. topped the charts in nine countries, including the United States and the United Kingdom, becoming his most commercially successful album and one of the best-selling albums of all time. 

Frequently cited by critics as one of the greatest albums of all time, it was nominated for a Grammy Award and produced seven Top Ten singles. The cover features an iconic photograph of Springsteen from behind, taken by Annie Leibovitz. The album was recorded with the E Street Band and producers Chuck Plotkin and Jon Landau over the course of several years, while Springsteen was also working on Nebraska. It delivers tighter songs with a brighter, more pop-influenced sound than his previous albums, and prominent synthesizer.

Writing and recording

Power Station recordings
Born in the U.S.A. is composed of twelve tracks, seven recorded at Power Station studios from April 26 through May 14, 1982: "Born in the U.S.A." (April 27); "Downbound Train" (April 27–28); "Working on the Highway" (April 30); "I'm on Fire" (May 11); "Glory Days" (May 5); "Darlington County" (May 13); and "I'm Goin' Down" (May 12–13).

Hit Factory recordings
"Cover Me" was the first song recorded, on January 25, 1982, at The Hit Factory. The four remaining tracks are "No Surrender" (October 25–27, 1983); "Bobby Jean" (October 10, 1983); "My Hometown", (June 29, 1983). "Dancing in the Dark" was the last to be recorded, on February 14, 1984. It was written overnight, after co-producer Jon Landau convinced Springsteen that the album needed a single. According to Dave Marsh in Glory Days, Springsteen was not impressed with Landau's approach. "Look," he snarled, "I've written 70 songs. You want another one, you write it." After blowing off some steam, Springsteen came in the next day with the entire song written.

Nebraska
The Born in the U.S.A. sessions covered more than two years (January 1982 through March 1984), and produced approximately 80 songs. It is impossible to separate them from the songs that comprised the album Nebraska; all but one of the January 1982 Nebraska demos were recorded with the E Street Band during April–May. The decision to create Nebraska from the demos came after these sessions. At one point, Springsteen considered combining both sources as a double-album release. "I had these two extremely different recording experiences going," he told Mark Hagen in an interview for Mojo published in January 1999. "I was going to put them out at the same time as a double record. I didn't know what to do." This was the most prolific period of Springsteen's career. Having bought a home in Hollywood Hills, Los Angeles, he worked in a garage studio constructed by Mike Batlan, his assistant, in the final months of 1982. He conceived of several proposed albums, but cancelled one after another and returned to recording new material.

Completion
Springsteen continued recording in Los Angeles after Nebraska was released, and reunited with the E Street Band at the Hit Factory in New York in May 1983. Plans were made to release an album titled Murder Incorporated, and then scrapped "because it lacked cohesion", according to Springsteen. Finally, Landau convinced Springsteen that Born in the U.S.A. was complete, after the recording of "Dancing in the Dark". The 12-track release left a large number of unused recordings "in the vaults", with Springsteen fans hoping for a "super box" anniversary collection at some point.

Music and lyrics
Born in the U.S.A. embraced a livelier mainstream sound than on previous Springsteen records, while continuing to explore progressive themes and values. It "remains the most tightly honed of Springsteen’s albums, the songs taut and economical, glistening with pop hooks and burnished with a dynamic Eighties sound". According to Roger Scott, it was a "defiantly rock 'n' roll" album, while Rolling Stones Debby Miller noted that while Springsteen incorporated "electronic textures" he "kept as its heart all of the American rock & roll from the early Sixties". While Springsteen's previous album had a stark quality, he maintained that the first half of Born in the U.S.A. was similar, being "written very much like Nebraska – the characters and the stories, the style of writing – except it's just in the rock-band setting." Springsteen had considered leaving "No Surrender" off the album, explaining that "you don't hold out and triumph all the time in life... You compromise, you suffer defeat; you slip into life's gray areas." Co-producer and guitarist Steven Van Zandt pushed for its inclusion, arguing that "the portrait of friendship and the song's expression of the inspirational power of rock music was an important part of the picture." “Bobby Jean” is thought to be a tribute to Van Zandt, who left the band as the album was being finalized. It's described as "classic Springsteen: the lyrics may put a lump in your throat, but the music says, Walk tall or don’t walk at all." Van Zandt also delivers the album's "most joyful moment" in “Darlington County”, when he "honks his way through the vocal harmonies" and "Springsteen starts to laugh".

The title track inspired the Annie Leibovitz photo of Springsteen's backside against the backdrop of an American flag, which was used as the album cover. Springsteen commented that "the flag is a powerful image, and when you set that stuff loose, you don't know what's gonna be done with it". Some people thought that the cover depicted Springsteen urinating on the flag, which he denied, insisting that "the picture of my ass looked better than the picture of my face, that's what went on the cover". According to political writer Peter Dreier, the music's "pop-oriented" sound and the marketing of Springsteen as "a heavily muscled rocker with an album cover featuring a giant US flag, may have overshadowed the album's radical politics." Music journalist Matty Karas regarded it as "a quintessential pop album that was also a perfect distillation of the anger and bitterness seething beneath the surface of Reagan-era America."

Marketing and sales
Born in the U.S.A. was the first compact disc manufactured in the United States for commercial release, and was manufactured by CBS and Sony at its newly-opened plant in Terre Haute, Indiana in September 1984. Columbia Records' CDs previously had been imported from Japan. It was the best-selling album of 1985 and of Springsteen's career. It was promoted with a worldwide concert tour and seven hit singles: "Dancing in the Dark", "Cover Me", "Born in the U.S.A.", "I'm on Fire", "Glory Days", "I'm Goin' Down", and "My Hometown". The album debuted at number nine on the Billboard 200 during the week of June 23, 1984, and after two weeks, it reached the top of the chart on July 7, staying at number one for seven weeks; it remained on the chart for one hundred forty three weeks. It was also a commercial success in Europe and Oceania; in the United Kingdom the album entered at number two on June 16, and after thirty four weeks, on February 16, 1985, it reached number one and topped the chart for five non consecutive weeks; it was present on the chart for one hundred thirty five weeks. It also topped the album charts in Australia, Austria, Germany, the Netherlands, New Zealand, Norway, Sweden and Switzerland.

Born in the U.S.A. proved to be one of the best-selling albums of all time. It was certified three times platinum by the BPI on July 25, 1985, denoting shipments of 900,000 units in the UK. After the advent of the North American Nielsen SoundScan tracking system in 1991, the album sold an additional 1,463,000 copies, and on April 19, 1995, it was certified fifteen times platinum by the RIAA for shipments of 17,000,000 copies in the US. By 2012, it had sold 30 million copies worldwide.

Critical reception

Born in the U.S.A. was lauded by many critics, while also generating some controversy. Retrospectively, Pitchfork called it "the bold, brilliant, and misunderstood apex of Bruce Springsteen’s imperial era." In July 1984, writing in Rolling Stone, Dave Marsh deemed it to be the artist's most accessible listen since Born to Run, managing to incorporate "techno-pop elements without succumbing to the genre's banalities". The magazine's Debby Miller said it was as well thought-out as Nebraska, but with more sophistication and spirit. "While the album finds its center in [its] cheering rock songs", it's the final two songs on either side that give it an "extraordinary depth". "Springsteen has always been able to tell a story better than he can write a hook," she says, "and these lyrics are way beyond anything anybody else is writing". She sees Springsteen creating "such a vivid sense of these characters" by "[giving] them voices a playwright would be proud of".

Robert Hilburn from the Los Angeles Times noted the album's "richer" musical settings allowed Springsteen to reach a wider audience. John Swenson of Saturday Review praised the disciplined writing style and Springsteen for "championing traditional rock values at a time when few newer bands show interest in such a direction". Writing retrospectively in The Telegraph, Neil McCormick declared it to be "an album of glittering paradoxes" which "manages to be both angry and celebratory, often in the same song".

In The Village Voice, Robert Christgau welcomed the absence of dejected themes of nostalgia and losers, along with the tougher lyrics, a sense of humor, and an upbeat worldview. It delivered "what teenagers loved about rock and roll", namely "that it just plain sounded good". Born in the U.S.A. was voted the best album of the year in the 1984 Pazz & Jop critics poll. Christgau, the poll's creator, also ranked it number one on his list, and in 1990 named it the ninth-best album of the 1980s. According to Christgau's Record Guide: The '80s (1990), while Born in the U.S.A. may have seemed more conservative than Springsteen's previous work, it showed him evolving on what was his "most rhythmically propulsive, vocally incisive, lyrically balanced, and commercially undeniable album". Greg Kot, writing retrospectively in the Chicago Tribune, called it "an 11-million-selling record with a conscience". AllMusic's William Ruhlmann interpreted the album as an apotheosis for Springsteen's reoccurring characters, and "marked the first time that Springsteen's characters really seemed to relish the fight and to have something to fight for". In a retrospective review for Q magazine Richard Williams gave it two stars out of five, criticising Springsteen's exaggeration of his usual characters and themes in a deliberate attempt at commercial success. He accused the singer trying to "exploit the American flag" and "to bury the anti-war message of Born In The USA beneath an impenetrable layer of clenched-fist bombast". This was, in his view, "downright irresponsible."

In 1987, Born in the U.S.A. was voted the fifth greatest rock album of all time in Paul Gambaccini's Critic's Choice poll of 81 critics, writers, and radio broadcasters. In 2003, Rolling Stone ranked Born in the U.S.A. number 85 on their list of the 500 Greatest Albums of All Time, 86 in a 2012 revised list, and 142 in a 2020 revised list. In 2013, it was named the 428th greatest album in a similar list published by NME.  The album was also included in the book 1001 Albums You Must Hear Before You Die.

Impact and legacy
Although Springsteen had been a well-known star before its release, Larry Rodgers wrote in the Arizona Republic that "it was not until he hit the gym to get buffed up and showed off his rear end in Annie Leibovitz's famous cover photo for Born in the U.S.A. that he became an American pop icon", touching off a wave of "Bossmania", as author Chris Smith called it. In his book A Race of Singers – Whitman's Working-Class Hero From Guthrie to Springsteen, Bryan K. Garman suggested that this new image helped Springsteen popularize his persona on a new scale, while tying him to certain political and socio-cultural issues, at a time when Ronald Reagan was promoting prosperity and US global influence "within a decidedly masculine framework." The album helped popularize American heartland rock, boosting the profiles of artists such as John Mellencamp, Tom Petty, and Bob Seger. When Mellencamp released Scarecrow (1985), critics described it as heartland rock and compared him to Springsteen.

As Born in the U.S.A. became a massive commercial success, Springsteen expressed mixed feelings about his growing fame, saying that being rich "doesn't make living easier, but it does make certain aspects of your life easier". "There were moments where it was very confusing", he added, "I never felt like I ever played a note for the money. I think if I did, people would know, and they'd throw you out of the joint".

Springsteen also expressed mixed feelings about the album itself, believing that Nebraska contains some of his strongest writing. While the title track on Born in the U.S.A. "more or less stood by itself", he declared, he called the album a "grab-bag", and "a group of songs about which I've always had some ambivalence." He acknowledged the powerful effect it had on his career, delivering his largest audience. "It forced me to question the way I presented my music and made me think harder about what I was doing," he said. The title track was widely misunderstood. According to Greg Kot and Parker Molloy, the chorus of the song felt like a patriotic anthem, but this was contradicted by the lyrics' depiction of the difficulties and marginalization returning working-class Vietnam veterans had to face. Written during the early 1980s recession in the United States, "the crestfallen verses mock the empty slogan in the chorus". It "was wilfully misinterpreted by many on the American Right" who used it during rallies, campaign events, and victory speeches.

Springsteen's manager, Jon Landau, said that there were no plans for the band to celebrate the album's thirtieth anniversary with a deluxe reissue box set in the manner of previous Springsteen albums. "At least not yet," he added. A full album live performance DVD titled Born in the U.S.A. Live: London 2013 was released exclusively through Amazon on January 14, 2014, along with High Hopes.

Track listing

Personnel
Bruce Springsteen – lead vocals, lead guitar, acoustic guitar

The E Street Band
Roy Bittan – piano, synthesizer, background vocals
Clarence Clemons – saxophone, percussion, background vocals
Danny Federici – Hammond organ, glockenspiel, piano on "Born in the U.S.A."
Garry Tallent – bass guitar, background vocals
Steven Van Zandt – rhythm guitar, acoustic guitar, mandolin, harmony vocals
Max Weinberg – drums, background vocals

Additional musicians
Richie "La Bamba" Rosenberg – background vocals on "Cover Me" and "No Surrender"
Ruth Davis – background vocals on "My Hometown"

Technical
Toby Scott – engineer
Bob Clearmountain – mixing
John Davenport, Jeff Hendrickson, Bruce Lampcov, Billy Strauss, Zöe Yanakas  – assistant engineers
Bob Ludwig – mastering
Bill Scheniman – engineer on "Cover Me"
Andrea Klein – art direction, design, cover design
Annie Leibovitz – photography
David Gahr – additional photography

Charts

Weekly charts

Year-end charts

Certifications and sales

See also
List of best-selling albums
List of best-selling albums in Australia
List of best-selling albums in Italy
List of best-selling albums in New Zealand
List of best-selling albums in the United States

References

External links

Born in the U.S.A. (Adobe Flash) at Radio3Net (streamed copy where licensed)
 

1984 albums
Bruce Springsteen albums
Grammy Hall of Fame Award recipients
Albums produced by Jon Landau
Albums produced by Steven Van Zandt
Albums produced by Chuck Plotkin
Columbia Records albums
Juno Award for International Album of the Year albums